List of A roads in zone 6 in Great Britain starting east of the A6 and A7 roads, and west of the A1 (road beginning with 6).

Single- and double-digit roads

Triple-digit roads

Four-digit roads (60xx)

Four-digit roads (61xx and higher)

References

 6
 
6